The Lochis Madonna is an oil on panel painting attributed to Titian (it has previously been attributed to Francesco Vecellio and Sante Zago) and dated to around 1508–1510. It is now in the Accademia Carrara in Bergamo. It is first recorded as part of the Lochis collection, after which it is named.

References

1510 paintings
Paintings of the Madonna and Child by Titian
Collections of the Accademia Carrara